The Japanese Coastal Defense Gun near Songsong on Rota in the Northern Marianas Islands, is a historic site that is listed on the U.S. National Register of Historic Places.  The gun emplacement was built by the Japanese military in 1941.  It was listed on the National Register in 1984.

The gun included is a Japanese 140 millimeter coastal defense gun of Model 3 type. It is placed in a camouflaged, reinforced concrete casemate within the cliff overlooking the entrance to Rota's East Harbor. The defense gun itself was manufactured in Japan in 1925, and is bolted into place.

See also
National Register of Historic Places listings in the Northern Mariana Islands

References 

Buildings and structures on the National Register of Historic Places in the Northern Mariana Islands
Military installations established in 1941
Artillery of Japan
Rota (island)
World War II on the National Register of Historic Places in the Northern Mariana Islands